St. John's Church is a parish church of the Church of Norway in Bergen Municipality in Vestland county, Norway. It is located in the Sydnes area of the city of Bergen. It is one of the five churches for the Bergen Cathedral parish which is part of the Bergen domprosti (arch-deanery) in the Diocese of Bjørgvin. The red brick church was built in a cruciform design between 1891 and 1894 in the Gothic Revival style. The architect was Herman Backer. The church seats about 1250 people, making it the largest church in Bergen. It was consecrated on 15 March 1894.

History
On 1 January 1885, the new parish of St. John was created out of the large Bergen Cathedral parish. In 1888, an architectural contest was conducted for the design of a new church. It was built from drawings by the architect Herman Major Backer (1856–1932). On 27 November 1891, the cornerstone was laid. The building process was first led by architect Adolf Fischer and from 1891 by Hans Heinrich Jess. The church was consecrated on 15 March 1894. The frescoes in the Church's ceiling date from 1924 and were completed by Hugo Lous Mohr (1889–1970).

The organ was built by Schlag & Söhne of Württemberg, Germany. It was modernized by Josef Hilmar Jørgensen of Oslo in 1967. The altarpiece depicts Christ in prayer and was designed in 1894 by Marcus Grønvold. The main tower has four stair towers and a carillon. It was designed by Verein Bochum in Bochum, Westphalia.

The church was a parish church for the St. John's parish in central Bergen from 1894 until 2002. In 2002, several urban parishes in central Bergen were merged to form the Bergen Cathedral parish, which includes five main churches.

Media gallery

References

External links
 Photos
 

Churches in Bergen
Brick churches in Norway
Cruciform churches in Norway
19th-century Church of Norway church buildings
Churches completed in 1894
1885 establishments in Norway
Event venues established in 1894